Damir Jurković (born 8 June 1970) is a retired football defender from Croatia.

External links
 

forum.b92.net

1970 births
Living people
Association footballers not categorized by position
Yugoslav footballers
Croatian footballers
HNK Hajduk Split players
NK Zagreb players
NK Istra players
HNK Segesta players
NK Samobor players
Yugoslav First League players
Croatian Football League players